is a Japanese singer. Her career began in 2002 when she passed the audition for Hello! Project Kids, an all-female child pop group under Hello! Project. She continued to sing in that group and became a part of four smaller groups composed of Hello! Project Kids members—Aa!, Sexy Otonajan, Buono! and Berryz Kobo. She was the sub-captain of Berryz Kobo until their indefinite hiatus in 2015. She became a member of female pop band PINK CRES. (Pink Crescendo).

Career

2002–2004: Hello! Project Kids

In 2002, Natsuyaki successfully passed the Hello! Project Kids' Audition alongside other members of Berryz Kobo. As a member of Berryz Kobo, she participated in the band's weekly radio show Berryz Kobo Kiritsu! Rei! Chakuseki!. That same year, she was cast in Koinu Dan no Monogatari, however she did not have a large part due to her age. Many members of Hello! Project Kids and Morning Musume participated in this film.

In 2004, Hello! Project participated in a large shuffle group that produced one single, "All For One & One For All!". This song is considered one of the themes of Hello! Project. In addition to the H.P. All Stars, she was placed in two shuffle units, Aa! and Sexy Otonajan. The group was made up of Miki Fujimoto from Morning Musume, Megumi Murakami from Cute and Miyabi. They produced one song called "Onna, Kanashii, Otona".

Earlier, in 2003, she was chosen to join the group Aa!, which consisted of fellow Hello! Project Kids member Airi Suzuki and was led by then Morning Musume member Reina Tanaka. The group released one single titled "First Kiss," on October 29, 2003. The group went on hiatus until the Hello! Project 2009 Summer tour at which many old shuffle units were renewed. During these concerts, Tanaka was replaced by Saho Akari, since Reina had joined the unit High King. The unit released one song, titled "YES YES YES" as part of the "Happy Wedding Song Cover" album released by Hello! Project.

2004–2016: Berryz Kobo and Buono!

Miyabi joined Buono! alongside Berryz Kobo group-mate Momoko Tsugunaga and Airi Suzuki from Cute. The unit was officially announced at the Nakayoshi magazine Festival 2007 on July 21, 2007, at Tokyo's Sunshine City in Ikebukuro. They sang both the opening ("Kokoro no Tamago") and ending ("Honto no Jibun") themes for the anime adaptation of the Shugo Chara! manga. Buono! continued to record the ending and opening themes for the first season of the anime. During the second season, Buono! recorded only the ending themes, as the opening themes were handled by Shugo Chara Egg! and Guardians 4, two other groups formed for the sake of performing Shugo Chara! music.

2016–present: Pink Cres.

After Berryz Kobo went on indefinite hiatus, Miyabi took a one-month break and then joined the YouTube show "Green Room" with fellow former Berryz Kobo member Chinami Tokunaga, which was uploaded weekly and centered around the behind the scenes aspects of Up Front Group members.

In August 2015, Miyabi announced she was creating a new girl group and held auditions on July 1, 2015. The group, Pink Cres., was later revealed at Buono!'s 2016 Buono! Festa concert.

Discography

Studio Albums

Singles

Solo photobooks

Acting

Television
 Little Hospital (リトル・ホスピタル) (2003)

Movies
 Koinu Dan no Monogatari (2002)
 Promise Land ~Clovers no Daibōken~ (2004)
 Gomennasai (October 29, 2011)
 Ōsama Game (2011)

Radio
 Berryz Kobo Kiritsu! Rei! Chakuseki! (March 30, 2005 – March 31, 2009)
 Tsuukai! Berryz Okoku (July 3, 2009 – March 30, 2012) (Co-host: Sugaya Risako and Kumai Yurina)

References

External links
 
 PINK CRES. Official Website
 Miyabi Natsuyaki Official Blog on Ameba

1992 births
Aa! members
Berryz Kobo members
Buono! members
Hello! Project Kids members
Japanese idols
Japanese child singers
Japanese television personalities
Living people
Musicians from Chiba Prefecture
21st-century Japanese singers
21st-century Japanese actresses